Robert Coleman Richardson (June 26, 1937 – February 19, 2013) was an American experimental physicist whose area of research included sub-millikelvin temperature studies of helium-3. Richardson, along with David Lee, as senior researchers, and then graduate student Douglas Osheroff, shared the 1996 Nobel Prize in Physics for their 1972 discovery of the property of superfluidity in helium-3 atoms in the Cornell University Laboratory of Atomic and Solid State Physics.

Richardson was born in Washington D.C. He went to high school at Washington-Lee in Arlington, Virginia. He later described Washington-Lee's biology and physics courses as "very old-fashioned" for the time. "The idea of 'advanced placement' had not yet been invented," he wrote in his Nobel Prize autobiography. He took his first calculus course when he was a sophomore in college.

Richardson attended Virginia Tech and received a B.S. in 1958 and a M.S. in 1960. He received his PhD from Duke University in 1965.

Background
At the time of his death, he was the Floyd Newman Professor of Physics at Cornell University, although he no longer operated a laboratory. From 1998 to 2007 he served as Cornell's vice provost for research, and from 2007 to 2009 was senior science adviser to the president and provost. His past experimental work focused on using Nuclear Magnetic Resonance to study the quantum properties of liquids and solids at extremely low temperatures.

Richardson was an Eagle Scout, and mentioned the Scouting activities of his youth in the biography he submitted to the Nobel Foundation at the time of his award.

Richardson claimed that he did not believe in an anthropomorphic God, but it is unclear what specific beliefs he held.

Awards and honors
Oliver E. Buckley Condensed Matter Prize (1981)
Nobel Prize in Physics (1996)
Golden Plate Award of the American Academy of Achievement (1997)
Elected member of the American Philosophical Society (2001)

See also

Cryogenics
Condensed matter physics
Timeline of low-temperature technology

References

External links
 Cornell webpage
 Freeview video Interview with Robert Richardson by the Vega Science Trust
 Obituaries
 Cornell obituary

  

  including the Nobel Lecture, December 7, 1996 The Pomeranchuk Effect
 J. D. Reppy and D. M. Lee, "Robert C. Richardson", Biographical Memoirs of the National Academy of Sciences (2015)

1937 births
2013 deaths
American Nobel laureates
American physicists
Cornell University faculty
Cornell Laboratory of Atomic and Solid State Physics
Duke University alumni
Duke University faculty
Experimental physicists
Nobel laureates in Physics
Virginia Tech alumni
Members of the United States National Academy of Sciences
Oliver E. Buckley Condensed Matter Prize winners
Members of the American Philosophical Society
Washington-Liberty High School alumni